The Cyprus International Football Tournament was an annual winter association football friendly competition for national teams that takes place in Cyprus. It was traditionally held in February as a friendly tournament since at least 1997, and last played in 2011. The 2006 tournament was played in two parallel groups.

History
Of various matches played in February 1995 and 1996 it is not clear whether they were part of a tournament or not (most likely they were just a collection of unrelated friendlies).

1995
 Norway   7–0 Estonia
Jakobsen, Bohinen, Brattbakk, Halle
 Cyprus   0–2 Norway
Leonhardsen, Flo
 Cyprus   3–1 Estonia
Gogić, Engomitis, LarkouReim

1996
 Estonia  0–0 Azerbaijan

 Cyprus   1–0 Estonia
Konstantinou
 Estonia  2–2 Faroe Islands
Kristal, RajalaJohannesen, Jarnskor
 Azerbaijan 3–0 Faroe Islands
Lychkin, Hüseynov, Qurbanov

Winners

References

External links 
 Cyprus International Tournament at Rec.Sport.Soccer Statistics Foundation

International association football competitions hosted by Cyprus
International men's association football invitational tournaments
Recurring sporting events established in 1997
1997 establishments in Cyprus